Michael Eugene Stamm (born August 6, 1952) is an American former backstroke swimmer who earned a gold medal as a member of the winning U.S. team in the men's 4×100-meter medley relay at the 1972 Summer Olympics in Munich, Germany.  At the 1972 Olympics, the 20-year-old Stamm also won individual silver medals in the 100-meter and in the 200-meter backstroke.

At that time, Stamm was the second-best backstroker in the world, behind East German Roland Matthes.  Stamm managed to break Matthes' world record in the 200-meter backstroke only once, in 1970, but Matthes recaptured it three weeks later.

Stamm was coached by James Counsilman at Indiana University.

See also
 List of Indiana University (Bloomington) people
 List of Olympic medalists in swimming (men)
 List of World Aquatics Championships medalists in swimming (men)
 World record progression 200 metres backstroke
 World record progression 4 × 100 metres medley relay

References
 
 Mike Stamm. johnfry.com
  iuhoosiers.cstv.com
  San Diego Hall of Champions
  Indiana Hoosiers
  www.indiana.edu

External links

 

1952 births
Living people
American male backstroke swimmers
World record setters in swimming
Indiana Hoosiers men's swimmers
Olympic gold medalists for the United States in swimming
Olympic silver medalists for the United States in swimming
Swimmers from Los Angeles
Swimmers at the 1972 Summer Olympics
World Aquatics Championships medalists in swimming
Medalists at the 1972 Summer Olympics
20th-century American people
21st-century American people